"Breakthrough" is a song recorded by South Korean girl group Twice. It is the group's fifth Japanese maxi single, featuring three other tracks. The song was pre-released digitally on June 12, 2019, and the CD single was later released on July 24 by Warner Music Japan.

Background and release
On April 6, 2019, Twice announced the release of their fifth Japanese single titled "Breakthrough". On June 12, it was pre-released as a digital single on various online music portals and the full music video was also released online on the same day. 

The single physically released on July 24, 2019, along with the news that Twice would appear in a commercial for cosmetic brand "Aube", featuring "Breakthrough" as the commercial song.

In celebration of the release of the new songs, Twice's new AbemaTV original variety show would be aired on July 19. Twice members would fulfill requests from fans which has been recruited in advance, on SNS at all Hawaii locations. A special gift campaigns was held sequentially from the 12th. Ten types of "AbemaTV x Twice" hashtags have been attracted attention, trending for one week in a row, and a special number from campaign also trends for three consecutive nights. For the gift of the campaign, fans would given the right to meet Twice.

Composition
"Breakthrough" was composed by Jan Baars, Rajan Muse, Ronnie Icon with lyrics written by Yu Shimoji. It was described as a dramatic, brassier electro-pop sound that puts the nonet's silky smooth vocals front and center and it's "meant to evoke the feelings of a cool summer night".

Music video 
An accompanying music video for the song was directed by Naive Creative Production and was released on June 11, 2019, on YouTube. The music video begins with the same split-colored set to emphasize the darker feel of "Happy Happy". The music video also features neon signs that declare the titles of singles. Stylistically, in "Breakthrough", the group is seen dancing at night in sensual black outfits—similar to ones seen in the music video for "Fancy"—and imposing white power suits. By May 2021, the video had received over 100 million views on YouTube, earning Twice a record for having "the most music videos with more than 100 million views on YouTube among girl groups in the world".

Promotion
On July 5, 2019, Twice performed "Breakthrough" for the first time on Music Station 2 Hour Special episode. It was also performed during Twice World Tour 2019–2020 "Twicelights"'s Japanese leg, starting on October 23, 2019, in Sapporo. On September 28, they performed "Breakthrough" on NHK Shibuya Note Presents Twice Request Live, a spin-off project of the music program Shibuya Note.

Commercial performance
The CD single debuted at number 2 on the daily ranking of Oricon Singles Chart with 128,525 units sold on its release day. It also ranked number 2 on the weekly Oricon Singles Chart with 229,326 copies sold, while topped the Billboard Japan recorded 288,502 copies sold and 3,451 downloads from July 22–28, 2019.

Track listing

Korean version
The Korean version of "Breakthrough" was released on September 23, 2019, as the seventh track of Twice's eighth extended play (EP) Feel Special as a special gift for fans. The Korean lyrics were written by Olivia Choi.

Charts

Weekly charts

Year-end charts

Certifications

Release history

Notes

References

2019 singles
2019 songs
J-pop songs
Japanese-language songs
Korean-language songs
Twice (group) songs
Billboard Japan Hot 100 number-one singles